The 2018 Derry riots were riots and civil disturbances taking place in Derry, Northern Ireland from 8 July 2018, before the Protestant Orange Order parade. It was the first 12 July parade to take place in Derry for five years. Violence broke out in the republican Bogside area in what has been called the worst in the city in "decades". The Police Service of Northern Ireland (PSNI) has blamed the New IRA group for trying to kill police officers. Riot police fired plastic baton rounds, whilst at least 70 petrol bombs have been thrown at them.

The riots have been condemned by senior leaders, including Sinn Féin leader Mary Lou McDonald who attended a "not in my name" rally. An Ulster Unionist Party MLA has claimed that the republican rioters are "using children" to blame the PSNI for the violence.

Violence linked to the riots overspilled in other parts of Northern Ireland. On 13 July, the house of Gerry Adams in west Belfast was attacked with a home-made bomb. Adams survived injury and claimed that his two grandchildren were standing at the doorway only ten minutes before the blast at 10:50 pm. The house of another republican in Belfast, Bobby Storey, was also attacked the same day. However, no casualties were reported in either of the attacks.

On 20 July, the New IRA claimed responsibility for gun and bomb attacks at police during the disturbances in Derry.

See also
1996 Derry riots
Belfast City Hall flag protests

References

Derry riots
Derry riots
21st century in Derry (city)
Derry riots
Protests in Northern Ireland
Real Irish Republican Army
Riots and civil disorder in Northern Ireland
Attacks in the United Kingdom in 2018